Ochyrotica buergersi is a moth of the family Pterophoridae. It is known from New Guinea, New Britain and Santa Isabel.

References

External links
Papua Insects

Ochyroticinae
Moths described in 1916